The Oceania National Olympic Committees (acronym: ONOC) is an international organization that congregates the 17 National Olympic Committees (NOCs) of Oceania.

It often assembles with other continental NOCs in the form of the Association of National Olympic Committees (ANOC).

Member associations

In the following table, the year in which the NOC was recognized by the International Olympic Committee (IOC) is also given if it is different from the year in which the NOC was created.

Associate members

There are seven associate members. Pitcairn Islands Sports is sometimes added

Events

 Pacific Games
 Pacific Mini Games

See also

 Asian Games
 Asian Winter Games
 Oceania Paralympic Committee

References

External links

 Official website

Oceania
Sports governing bodies in Oceania
Olympic organizations
Sports organizations established in 1981